Susan Mann may refer to:

Susan Mann (Canadian historian) (born 1941), President of York University
Susan L. Mann (born 1943), American historian and sinologist